Cumberland Marsh Natural Area Preserve is a Natural Area Preserve located in New Kent County, Virginia near the Cumberland Hospital Children-Adolescents. Owned by the Nature Conservancy, it preserves  of freshwater tidal marsh along the Pamunkey River, providing habitat for bald eagles, osprey, blue herons, and egrets, as well as for the sensitive joint-vetch.  It is an important habitat for wintering waterfowl as well.

References
Preserve webpage

Virginia Natural Area Preserves
Protected areas of New Kent County, Virginia
Landforms of New Kent County, Virginia
Marshes of Virginia